Dana Albert Nafziger (born October 26, 1953) is a former American football player who played five seasons with the Tampa Bay Buccaneers of the National Football League.

Early life 
Nafziger attended Western High School in Anaheim, California.

College career 
Playing college football at California Polytechnic State University, Nafziger was recognized as a skilled blocking tight end and graduated with 63 career catches for 892 yards and seven touchdowns. 

Following his senior season of 1976, he earned all-conference accolades from the CCAA as well as AP Little All-America status.

Professional career 
Nafziger was signed by Tampa Bay in September 1977. While originally worked out as a prospective linebacker, the Buccaneers soon moved him to tight end and also utilized him heavily on special teams. He was part of the 1979 Tampa Bay squad which advanced to the NFC Championship Game, producing two sacks and a pair of fumble recoveries for the Central Division champions that fall.

During the 1981 season, as the franchise again made the playoffs, Nafziger led the club with 22 special teams tackles for the year.

References

External links
Just Sports Stats

Living people
1953 births
Players of American football from Illinois
American football tight ends
American football linebackers
Cal Poly Mustangs football players
Tampa Bay Buccaneers players
People from Woodstock, Illinois
Sportspeople from the Chicago metropolitan area